Gjinovec is a village in the former Trebisht in Dibër County in northeastern Albania. At the 2015 local government reform it became part of the municipality Bulqizë. It is situated within the Gollobordë region, near the border with North Macedonia.

Name
The name of the village is derived from a personal name Gjin or Gin with the suffix  ovec.

Demographics
A demographic Bulgarian survey of the population of the village, done in 1873, recorded the village as having 90 households with 134 male Bulgarian Christian residents and 118 male Muslim (Pomak) residents.

The inhabitants of Gjinovec are speakers of a south Slavic language (Macedonian or Bulgarian) and the village has traditionally contained a Muslim (Torbeš or Pomak) population.

According to a 2007 estimate, Gjinovec's population was 314.

References

Populated places in Bulqizë
Villages in Dibër County
Macedonian Muslim villages